The 1977 UCI Road World Championships took place on 27 August 1977 in San Cristóbal, Venezuela.

Results

Medal table

External links 

 Men's results
 Women's results
  Results at sportpro.it

 
UCI Road World Championships by year
UCI Road World Championships 1977
1977 in road cycling
Uci Road World Championships, 1977